Ogemaw, a variant spelling of ogema, is derived from the Anishinaabemowin word ogimaa meaning "chief", may refer to the following places in the U.S. state of Michigan:

 Ogemaw County, Michigan
 Ogemaw Township, Michigan

See also
John Okemos